Phi Alpha Mu is a local, social sorority that was founded at McDaniel College (Western Maryland College) in 1926. The organization has over 1,000 alumnae, with an increasing number of sisters joining every year. Phi Alpha Mu is also one of the few sororities that currently initiates transgender, nonbinary, gender non-conforming, and genderqueer members, stating "We as Phi Alpha Mu are proud to accept sisters and siblings no matter gender identity, gender presentation, sexual orientation, race, ethnicity, color, disability, religion, etc. Discrimination has no place in Phi Alpha Mu and we as a sorority will continue the fight both as sisters and siblings, as well as a Greek Organization."

History
In 1923, Phi Alpha Mu began as a group called the Snake Charmers. This group evolved into an organization called F.A.M., jokingly referring to themselves as "Find A Man". The club combined with another group on the Western Maryland campus, Zeta Gamma, adopting the Greek letters for F.A.M, thus becoming Phi Alpha Mu. The club chose purple and white as the official club colors and the purple pansy as its official flower. In 1926, Western Maryland College officially recognized the sorority and it became one of the first Greek organizations on campus. In 1937, the sorority began its official yearbook, "The Torch" named after The torch of learning, which symbolizes the group and its ideals. The sorority adopted Gamma Beta Chi as its brother fraternity in 1941, a fellow local organization at McDaniel, and adopted the purple cow as their mascot. Although there is continuous pressure to become a national organization, which started in the 1970s when other fraternities and sororities joined national organizations, the sorority refuses to follow the trend and compromise the self made rules, constitutions, and traditions that maintain the intimacy and closeness that make it a unique organization. Today, Phi Alpha Mu is the only remaining original local sorority at McDaniel College.

Philanthropy 
Serving the community is one of the main values of Phi Alpha Mu as stated in the mission statement. The official philanthropies of Phi Alpha Mu are House of Ruth and American Cancer Society. The organization is very active in the local community as well, participating in various philanthropic events such as Relay for Life and their annual Race for Her 5k, which benefits both the House of Ruth Maryland and the Phi Alpha Mu Endowed Scholarship, a scholarship to aid sorority women with financial difficulties.

Mission Statement
The mission of Phi Alpha Mu is to promote love, trust, loyalty, and respect between each sister and to support growth and learning as individuals and as a group while providing service and compassion to their community thereby ensuring the survival of the group and the groups' ideals.

Creed
Love and sisterhood, our principle, yet lofty ideals, are obtainable only through a concentrated effort by every member of Phi Alpha Mu. Membership in this sorority connotes responsibility, a willingness to give the most of ourselves at all times; for halfhearted efforts are meaningless and can do us no good. A sister must be willing to accept such a responsibility with pleasure. Membership also means unwavering loyalty to and pride in Phi Alpha Mu. If one, only one, member does not sincerely believe that she is part of "the best sorority on The Hill" and is not willing to work to keep it so, then as a consequence, the entire sorority will suffer. There are no secrets among the sisters of Phi Alpha Mu. Nothing can be called a secret when a group of women as large as us, share in its knowledge. Yet this sharing cannot reach beyond the bounds of our clubroom. How can we distinguish ourselves, what will make us different from any other group of persons if their awareness of our fortunes and problems is equal to ours? Upon formal initiation, a woman has committed herself to this responsibility, loyalty, and pride. This commitment is not to be taken lightly, never to be forgotten, and never to be placed second to involvement in any activity.

References

External links 

Fraternities and sororities in the United States
Student organizations established in 1926
1926 establishments in Maryland